The Red Pen is a two-act operetta and early radio opera composed by Geoffrey Toye to a libretto by A. P. Herbert.  The piece, described by its creators as "a sort of opera" was written for the BBC, following Herbert's successful Riverside Nights, and had a running time of about 90 minutes. It was first broadcast on the radio on 24 March 1925. It was broadcast again in 1927.

Roles

The performers for the second broadcast were Gladys Palmer, Vivienne Chatterton, John Buckley, Harold Kimberley, John Tanner, and Sydney Granville. The composer conducted the Wireless Orchestra.

Synopsis
The first act is set in Hyde Park and the second in the Ministry of Verse at St. James's Park. The story is set "in the near future" (the late 1920s), and opens with the whimsical premise that the "General Federation of Poets and Writers", a trade-union for authors, is agitating for the nationalisation of their industry.  "The Red Pen", from which the play takes its title, is their march, a play on The Red Flag.  In Act II, set six months later, the newly established Ministry of Verse is run in a comically bureaucratic civil service style.

References

Jacobs, Arthur (1992), 'Toye, Geoffrey' in The New Grove Dictionary of Opera, ed. Stanley Sadie (London) 

English-language operettas
Radio operas
1927 operas
Operas by Geoffrey Toye
Operas
Operas set in London